Pennsylvania Route 472 (PA 472) is a north–south state highway in Chester and Lancaster counties in Pennsylvania. Its northern terminus is at PA 372 in Quarryville. PA 472 is a two-lane undivided road that passes through mostly rural areas along a northwest-southeast alignment. The route passes through the borough of Oxford, where it intersects the southern terminus of PA 10 and has an interchange with U.S. Route 1 (US 1). PA 472 was originally designated in 1928 between US 1/PA 12/PA 42 in Oxford and PA 372 in Quarryville. The route was extended south to Hickory Hill by 1930, at which time the entire length of the route was paved. The southern terminus of PA 472 was extended to PA 841 in Lewisville in 1937.

Route description

PA 472 begins at an intersection with PA 841 in the community of Lewisville in Elk Township, Chester County a short distance north of the Maryland border. From this intersection, the route heads west-northwest on two-lane undivided Lewisville Road. The road runs through farms and residential areas, curving to the north. PA 472 runs through a mix of farmland and woodland with some homes, turning west and passing through the community of Peacedale. The route curves northwest and comes to the community of Hickory Hill, where it turns north onto Hickory Hill Road. PA 472 continues northwest into East Nottingham Township and passes through rural land with mixed residential subdivisions. The road curves west and enters the borough of Oxford, where it becomes Market Street and is lined with homes. The route heads into the commercial downtown and crosses an East Penn Railroad line at-grade before intersecting Lincoln Street and the southern terminus of PA 10 at Third Street. At this point, PA 472 turns north for a one block concurrency with PA 10 on Third Street before splitting by turning northwest onto Lancaster Avenue. The road turns west and heads through residential areas with some farm fields, becoming Lancaster Pike and reaching an interchange with the US 1 freeway. A park and ride lot is situated within the northeast quadrant of this interchange. Past this interchange, the route leaves Oxford for Lower Oxford Township and heads northwest through farmland with some wooded areas and homes, passing through the community of Mount Vernon. 

PA 472 crosses the Octoraro Lake along the East Branch Octoraro Creek into Colerain Township in Lancaster County and becomes Kirkwood Pike. At this point, the route enters the Pennsylvania Dutch Country of eastern Lancaster County, which is home to many Amish farms. The road runs through agricultural areas with some woods and homes, passing through the community of Union before reaching the community of Kirkwood. Here, the route turns west-northwest through more rural land with some development, crossing the West Branch Octoraro Creek. PA 472 passes through the community of Collins before crossing into Eden Township. The road continues into the borough of Quarryville and becomes South Lime Street, passing homes and some businesses. PA 472 reaches its northern terminus at an intersection with PA 372.

History
When Pennsylvania first legislated routes in 1911, present-day PA 472 was not given a route number. PA 472 was designated in 1928 to run from US 1/PA 12/PA 42 (now PA 10) in Oxford northwest to PA 372 in Quarryville, following its current alignment. At this time, the roadway was paved near Oxford and between Kirkwood and a point northwest of Collins. By 1930, PA 472 was extended south from Oxford to Hickory Hill along a roadway under construction. By this time, the entire length between Oxford and Quarryville was paved. In 1937, the southern terminus of PA 472 was extended from Hickory Hill to its current location at PA 841 in Lewisville along a paved road. PA 472 has remained along the same alignment since.

Major intersections

See also

References

External links

Pennsylvania Highways: PA 472
PA 472 at AARoads.com

472
Transportation in Chester County, Pennsylvania
Transportation in Lancaster County, Pennsylvania